John Lacche or Lecche (fl. 1380–1388) of Dartmouth, Devon, was an English politician.

He was a Member (MP) of the Parliament of England for Dartmouth in January 1380, 1381, October 1382, February 1383 and February 1388.

References

Year of birth missing
Year of death missing
English MPs January 1380
Members of the Parliament of England for Dartmouth
English MPs 1381
English MPs October 1382
English MPs February 1383
English MPs February 1388